The Hit Sound of the Everly Brothers is an album by the Everly Brothers, released in 1967. It was re-released on CD by Collectors' Choice Music in 2005.

Sessions
The album was recorded in sessions in December 1966 and January 1967 and released in March 1967.  Among the musicians were several Wrecking Crew members, Glen Campbell, Larry Knechtel, Ray Pohlman, and Hal Blaine.

Track listing

Side 1
 "Blueberry Hill" (Al Lewis, Vincent Rose, Larry Stock) – 3:02
 "I'm Movin' On" (Hank Snow) – 2:28
 "Devil's Child" (Irwin Levine, Neil Sheppard) – 2:40
 "Trains and Boats and Planes" (Burt Bacharach, Hal David) – 3:03
 "Sea of Heartbreak" (Hal David, Paul Hampton) – 2:22
 "Oh, Boy!" (Norman Petty, Bill Tilghman, Sonny West) – 2:47

Side two
 "(I'd Be) A Legend in My Time" (Don Gibson) – 2:47
 "Let's Go Get Stoned" (Josephine Armstead, Nickolas Ashford, Valerie Simpson) – 3:07
 "Sticks and Stones" (Henry Glover, Titus Turner) – 2:48
 "The House of the Rising Sun" (Terry Holmes, Alan Price, Nicholas Ray, Josh White) – 4:36
 "She Never Smiles Anymore" (Jimmy Webb) – 3:19
 "Good Golly Miss Molly" (Robert Blackwell, John Marascalco) – 2:49

Personnel
Technical
Eddie Brackett, Lee Herschberg - engineer
Ed Thrasher - art direction, photography

References

1967 albums
The Everly Brothers albums
Warner Records albums
Albums produced by Dick Glasser